The Azadan (Middle Persian: ,; meaning 'free' and 'noble') were a class of Iranian nobles. The Kingdom of Armenia adopted the same hierarchy as that of the Parthians, which included the  class, which was used to label the Armenian middle and lower nobility.

The Sasanians, who supplanted the Parthians in 224, maintained the same divisions of the nobility as their predecessor. The  and  formed the bulk of the cavalry, which in turn formed the backbone of the Sasanian army. The  were analogous to the knights of Medieval Europe.

The  are first attested in the bilingual Hajjiabad inscription of the King of Kings Shapur I:

They are later mentioned in the Paikuli inscription of 293, erected by Shapur I's grandson Narseh, who mentions the  along with other groups of the nobility. They are likewise mentioned in the inscription of Shapur II at Meshkinshahr. According to the 5th-century Byzantine Armenian historian Faustus of Byzantium, the  formed the bulk of Shapur II's royal bodyguard regiment.

References

Sources 
 
 
 
 
 
 
 
 
 

Social class in the Sasanian Empire
Iranian nobility
Parthian Empire
Iranian words and phrases